The Dalfsen train crash occurred on 23 February 2016 when a passenger train collided with a tracked elevated work platform on a level crossing at Dalfsen, Overijssel, Netherlands. One person was killed and six were injured, one seriously.

Accident
At 08:50 CET (07:50 UTC), a passenger train collided with an elevated work platform at Dalfsen, Overijssel, Netherlands. It is reported that the crane from company Van den Brink in Barneveld, was slowly crossing the line when it was hit by the train. It had waited at the crossing while one train passed, but then started to cross and was hit by a second train. All four vehicles were derailed. One person was killed; the driver of the train. There were fifteen passengers on board the train. Six of the survivors were injured, one person sustaining serious injuries.

Two of the injured were taken to hospital in Zwolle. They were the train's conductor and a female passenger. The other four were treated at the scene. Twelve ambulances were sent to the scene. An air ambulance from the University Medical Center Groningen attended.

The Grove MZ 90 CR elevated work platform weighed 20 tonnes. The platform had been parked on the south side of the railway line, and was to be driven to a point north of the railway where it was to be loaded onto a lorry. The operator waited until a train had passed before he started to cross, believing he had sufficient time to do so. Unknown to the operator, the next train was due in six minutes; the operator assumed he had approximately ten minutes. Unlike those in the United Kingdom, level crossings in the Netherlands provide no guidance for operators of large and/or slow vehicles, nor was a telephone link to a signalman provided. Thus the platform operator had no way of ascertaining that it was safe to cross.

Whilst he was crossing, he saw the train approaching and attempted to attract the attention of the train driver as he continued to cross in an attempt to clear the crossing before the train arrived. The platform was pushed  along the line until it collided with a pole supporting the overhead line. The impact caused the platform to break into its three main parts and lifted the front of the train, which derailed, stopping a further  further along the line. The cab of the train was destroyed, killing the driver. The platform operator jumped from the vehicle shortly before the collision, sustaining minor injuries.

Arriva instigated a bus replacement service between those stations.

Work to remove the train took place over the night of 23–24 February, with the first carriage being removed during the night. Once the train has been removed, repairs were made to the track and catenary,  of which were affected. The damaged carriages were taken to a depot in Meppel. Following repairs, the line was reopened in the evening of 27 February.

Investigations

The Dutch Safety Board (OVV) are responsible for investigating railway accidents in the Netherlands. An investigation was opened into the accident. The OVV published its final report into the accident in December 2016.

The investigation found that the cause of the crash was that the elevated work platform obstructed the line, but that there was no mechanism in place to allow the operator of the vehicle to ascertain whether or not it was safe to cross. Six recommendations were made. The impact forces sustained by the cab of the train were four times higher than those it was designed to withstand, which is why the cab was destroyed in the accident. The driver had insufficient time available to avoid the accident or retreat from the cab to a survival space within the train. Following the accident, vehicles with steel caterpillar tracks were prohibited from using level crossings in the Netherlands. One of the recommendations was that ProRail should look at the issue of drivers of large/slow vehicles being able to ascertain whether or not it was safe to cross a level crossing. ProRail has responded by stating that it is "embracing" the recommendations.

The Dutch police opened a separate investigation into the accident. The elevated work platform driver was detained for questioning. He could have faced charges of causing death by negligence, causing a fatal traffic collision and causing danger on the railway.

See also  
 Hixon rail crash in Britain,1968.

References

2016 in the Netherlands
Dalfsen
February 2016 events in Europe
Level crossing incidents in the Netherlands
Railway accidents in 2016
2016 disasters in the Netherlands